In Andhra Pradesh there are 3 central universities, 20 Autonomous Institutions, 25 state universities, 4 deemed universities, and 5 private universities.

State universities 

<small> Following the Jawaharlal Nehru Technological Universities Act, 2008 Jawaharlal Nehru Technological University was split into four universities, Jawaharlal Nehru Architecture and Fine Arts University, Jawaharlal Nehru Technological University, Anantapur, Jawaharlal Nehru Technological University, Hyderabad and Jawaharlal Nehru Technological University, Kakinada. This is also reflected by the UGC list. The date of establishment of all four institutes is therefore 2008, though Jawaharlal Nehru Technological University was established in 1972 by The Jawaharlal Nehru Technological University Act, 1972 which is what the UGC lists as the establishment date for Jawaharlal Nehru Technological University, Hyderabad.

Central universities

Central institutions (autonomous Institutions)

Deemed universities 

 granted deemed university status

Private universities

Colleges 

 Adoni Arts and Science College (AASC est in 1962), Adoni
 Aditya Institute of Technology and Management
 Andhra Loyola College
 Andhra Medical College
 Andhra Pradesh Residential Degree College
 Anil Neerukonda Institute of Technology and Sciences
 Annamacharya Institute of Technology and Science
 Bapatla Engineering College
Sir C.R. Reddy Educational Institutions
 Dhanekula Institute of Engineering and Technology
DVR & Dr HS MIC college of Technology
Fathima institute of medical sciences
 Gandhi Institute of Technology and Management
 Gayatri Vidya Parishad College of Engineering
 Godavari Institute of Engineering and Technology
 G Pulla Reddy College of Engineering & Technology
 Guntur Institute of Medical Sciences
K.B.N.College
 Krishna University College of Engineering and Technology. (KRUSF) 
 KSRM College of Engineering (KSRM)
 Kurnool Medical College
 Mrs. A. V. N. College (Est 1860) Visakapatnam
 MVGR College of Engineering
 Narasaraopeta Engineering College (NEC)
 NBKRIST
 NRI Institute of Technology Vijayawada
 QIS College of Engineering and Technology (QISE)
 Raghu Engineering College
 RVR & JC College of Engineering
 Sagi Rama Krishnam Raju Engineering College (SRKREC)
 Seshadri Rao Gudlavalleru Engineering College (SRGEC)
 Shree Institute of Technical Education (SITE)
 SMVM Polytechnic, Tanuku
 Sree Vidyanikethan Educational Trust (SVET)
 Sree Vidyanikethan Engineering College (SVEC)
 Sri Sathya Sai University
 Vasireddy Venkatadri Institute of Technology (VVIT)
 Velagapudi Ramakrishna Siddhartha Engineering College (VRSEC)
 Vignan's Institute of Information Technology
 Quba College of Engineering and Technology Nellore (QUBA)

Law colleges
 Andhra University College of Law, Visakhapatnam
 Acharya Nagarjuna University, Guntur
 Damodaram Sanjivayya National Law University, Visakhapatnam
 Sri Venkateswara College of Law, Tirupati
 Gitam School of Law, Visakhapatnam
Klu law college, Vijayawada
 NVP Law College, Visakhapatnam
 JC College of Law, Guntur
 PS Raju Law College, Kakinada
 Daita Sriramulu Hindu College of Law, Machilipatnam
 Sri R.K.M. Law College, Chittoor
 Sri Eshwar Reddy College of Law, Tirupati
 Visakha Law College, Visakhapatnam
 Indira Priyadarshini Law College, Ongole
 Veeravalli College of Law, Rajahmundhry
 KKC College of Law, Chittoor
 Anantha College of Law, Tirupati
 Smt Velagapudi Durgamba Siddhartha Law College, Vijayawada
 Dr Ambedkar Global Law Institute, Tirupati
 Sri Vijayanagar College of Law, Anantapur
 V.R. Law College, Nellore
  Ns law college devarajugattu near markapur

Notes

References 

Andhra Pradesh
Education
Education in Andhra Pradesh